Kallas is a common Estonian surname (meaning shore), and may refer to:

Aino Kallas (1878–1956), Finnish-Estonian writer
, Estonian poet and journalist
Kaja Kallas (born 1977), Estonian politician
Karol Kallas (born 1972), Estonian art critic and journalist (:et)
Kristina Kallas (born 1976), Estonian politician 
Madis Kallas (born 1981), Estonian decathlete
 (1929–2006), Estonian caricaturist and graphical artist
Oskar Kallas (1868–1946), Estonian diplomat and linguist
Rudolf Kallas (1851–1913), Estonian clergyman and pedagogue
Salim Kallas (1936−2013), Syrian actor and politician
Siim Kallas (born 1948), Estonian politician
Teet Kallas (born 1943), Estonian writer

Greek:
 Kallas, ancient Greek general of the Philip II of Macedon and Alexander the Great

See also
Kalas (disambiguation)
Kalla (disambiguation)
Callas (disambiguation)

Estonian-language surnames